Van Winitsky (born March 12, 1959) is a former professional tennis player from the United States. He achieved a career-high rankings of World No. 7 in doubles in October 1983 and world No. 35 in singles in February 1984.

Early and personal life
Winitsky was born in Miami, Florida, lived in Lauderhill, Florida, and is Jewish. His father Manny Winitsky was the best player of his age in Florida for 15 years, beginning at age 45. He lives in Delray Beach, Florida. Van attended North Miami Beach Senior High School and won the Florida state high school singles tennis championships as a freshman in 1974.

Tennis career
Winitsky won Junior Wimbledon, Junior U.S. Open and Junior Nat'l at Kalamazoo, Mich. in singles and doubles in 1977 and won 3 Junior Orange Bowl singles titles. He played college tennis for UCLA for one and a half years, and was an All American. He played on the 1978 U.S. Davis Cup team in with John McEnroe, Brian Gottfried, and Harold Solomon.

Winitsky enjoyed most of his tennis success while playing doubles. During his career, he won 9 ATP Tour doubles titles and finished runner-up an additional 11 times. Partnering Fritz Buehning in doubles, Winitsky finished runner-up at the 1983 US Open. Winitsky also was a quarter finalist in mixed doubles partnering with Rayni Fox Borinsky at the 1980 US Open. He won 3 ATP Tour singles titles and finished runner-up 1 additional time. His titles included 1981 Hong Kong Seiko Open over Mark Edmondson of Australia, 1982 Hollywood Bowl Classic in Guaruja, Brazil over Carlos Kirmayr of Brazil, and 1982 Hilton Head Shipyard WCT over Chris Lewis of New Zealand in the finals. His runner-up finish was the 1978 Cleveland Grand Prix against Peter Feigl of Austria.

At just before 21st birthday, he had surgery that resulted in a 16-inch scar and atrophied muscles. In 1985, he retired from ATP Tour after winning the WTT conference championships for the Miami Beach Breakers.

Career finals

Doubles (11 titles, 9 runner-ups)

See also

List of select Jewish tennis players

References

External links
 
 
 

American male tennis players
People from Lauderhill, Florida
Sportspeople from Delray Beach, Florida
Tennis players from Miami
UCLA Bruins men's tennis players
US Open (tennis) junior champions
Wimbledon junior champions
Living people
Jewish American sportspeople
Jewish tennis players
1959 births
Grand Slam (tennis) champions in boys' singles
21st-century American Jews